Dr. Vera Lúcia Gomes-Klein is a Brazilian botanist and professor at the Federal University of Goiás.  She specializes in plant taxonomy, particularly floristics and the classification of spermatophytes. She is manager of the Federal University of Goiás' Conservation Unit, which  consists of an herbarium, the August Forest of Saint Hilaire, and the Serra Dourada Biological Reserve.  She has described at least five species of melonleaf in the genus Cayaponia.

References

21st-century Brazilian botanists
Women botanists
21st-century Brazilian women scientists
21st-century women scientists
Living people
Academic staff of the Federal University of Goiás
Year of birth missing (living people)